Fred R. Moore (16 June 1857 – 1 March 1943) was an editor and publisher who became closely associated with Booker T. Washington until 1915 when Washington died. He worked to promote the National Negro Business League founded by Washington in 1900. He became editor and publisher of the Colored American Magazine in 1905, through Washington's influence. He had the reputation as one of the most important newspapermen in the US.

Again through Washington who bought New York Age, Moore became editor and purported owner in 1907, a position he held until his death.

He was born in Virginia to Evelyn Diggs. He married Ida Lawrence April 9, 1879 and they had numerous children.

He was a Republican, and U.S. president William H. Taft appointed him Minister to Liberia but he served for only a month. He lived at 14 Douglass Street in Brooklyn.

References

1857 births
1943 deaths
African-American publishers (people)
American publishers (people)
20th-century African-American people